The 1993 Stanley Cup playoffs the playoff tournament of the National Hockey League (NHL) began after the conclusion of the 1992–93 NHL season on April 18 and ended with the Montreal Canadiens defeating the Los Angeles Kings four games to one to win the Stanley Cup on June 9. These playoffs featured an NHL record 28 overtime games, of which the Canadiens set a playoff record for most overtime games won in one year with ten. The Canadiens also won 11 consecutive games during the playoffs, tying an NHL record.

The Presidents' Trophy-winning Pittsburgh Penguins, who had won the Stanley Cup the previous two years, were the favourite to repeat. However, both conferences saw numerous upsets as the third place team in every division reached their respective conference finals. This was the first time since the 1979 NHL-WHA merger that the Edmonton Oilers had missed the playoffs. It was also the first time that longtime Oilers and then-New York Rangers captain Mark Messier had missed the playoffs in his career. This was the only year between 1984 and 1994 that the Boston Bruins and Montreal Canadiens did not face each other in the playoffs. This was the last time that the New York Islanders won a playoff round before 2016. It was also the first time in the post-1967 expansion era that no team with a losing record qualified for the playoffs. Montreal's Cup championship remains the last time that a Canadian team won the Stanley Cup.

Playoff seeds
This marked the final season of the NHL's division-oriented playoff format (first used in 1982) which saw the top four teams in each division qualify for the playoffs automatically. A similar version of this playoff format was used for the 2021 Stanley Cup playoffs as a result of the COVID-19 pandemic.

Under the rules in place, the following teams qualified for the playoffs:

Prince of Wales Conference

Adams Division
 Boston Bruins, Adams Division champions – 109 points
 Quebec Nordiques – 104 points
 Montreal Canadiens – 102 points
 Buffalo Sabres – 86 points

Patrick Division
 Pittsburgh Penguins, Patrick Division champions, Prince of Wales Conference regular season champions, Presidents' Trophy winners – 119 points
 Washington Capitals – 93 points
 New York Islanders – 87 points (40 wins, 10 points head-to-head vs. New Jersey)
 New Jersey Devils – 87 points (40 wins, 4 points head-to-head vs. NY Islanders)

Clarence Campbell Conference

Norris Division
 Chicago Blackhawks, Norris Division champions, Clarence Campbell Conference regular season champions – 106 points
 Detroit Red Wings – 103 points
 Toronto Maple Leafs – 99 points
 St. Louis Blues – 85 points

Smythe Division
 Vancouver Canucks, Smythe Division champions – 101 points
 Calgary Flames – 97 points
 Los Angeles Kings – 88 points
 Winnipeg Jets – 87 points

Playoff bracket

Division Semifinals

Prince of Wales Conference

(A1) Boston Bruins vs. (A4) Buffalo Sabres

This was the sixth playoff series meeting between the Sabres and Bruins. Boston won all five previous series head-to-head, including last year's Adams Division Semifinals in seven games. Although Boston had entered the playoffs with the second best record in the entire NHL and the Sabres had the second lowest point total of any playoff team, Buffalo upset the Bruins by sweeping the heavily favored Boston squad. The fourth game saw Brad May's game-winning goal in overtime, which has become famous in NHL lore thanks to Rick Jeanneret's "May day!" call. This was the first playoff series victory for Buffalo since defeating Montreal in the 1983 Adams Division Semifinals.

(A2) Quebec Nordiques vs. (A3) Montreal Canadiens
This was the fifth playoff series between these two teams, with the teams splitting the previous four series. This was the final playoff series between the provincial rivals before the Nordiques moved to Denver in 1995 and became the Colorado Avalanche. This was the first playoff series between the teams since the 1987 Adams Division Finals, which was won by Montreal in seven games.

The Canadiens lost the first two games of this series against the rival Nordiques, due in part to a couple of weak goals let in by star Montreal goaltender Patrick Roy. Afterward, a newspaper in Roy's hometown district suggested he be traded, while Nordiques goaltending coach Dan Bouchard also proclaimed that his team had solved Roy. However, Montreal head coach Jacques Demers held himself to a promise he had made to Roy earlier in the season and kept him as the starting goalie.

With Montreal staring a potential 3–0 series deficit to Quebec in the face, overtime in Game 3 was marked by two disputed goals that were reviewed by the video goal judge. The first review ruled that Stephan Lebeau had knocked the puck in with a high stick, but the second upheld Montreal's winning goal as it was directed in by the skate of Quebec defenceman Alexei Gusarov and not that of a Montreal player. The game three overtime victory was the first in a record-setting streak of 10 consecutive overtime victories by the Canadiens in these playoffs.

(P1) Pittsburgh Penguins vs. (P4) New Jersey Devils
This was the second playoff series between these two teams. Pittsburgh won the only previous meeting in the 1991 Patrick Division Semifinals in seven games.

The two-time defending Stanley Cup champions were a heavy favorite to be the first team since the 1980–1983 New York Islanders to win more than two consecutive Cups. Entering the playoffs as the Presidents' Trophy winner, the Penguins faced off against the fourth place team from their division the New Jersey Devils. By winning the first three games of the series, Pittsburgh extended its playoff winning streak to 14 games; this dated back to Game 4 of the 1992 Patrick Division Final against the New York Rangers and set an NHL playoff record for longest winning streak. The streak ended in Game 4 when the Devils defeated Pittsburgh, 4–1. The Penguins quickly closed out the Devils in the next game by a score of 5–2 to advance to the second round.

(P2) Washington Capitals vs. (P3) New York Islanders
This was the sixth playoff series between these two teams. New York previous won four of the first five meetings all from 1983 to 1987. The last of those meetings was won by New York in the famed "Easter Epic" in the 1987 Patrick Division Semifinals.

Game six of this series was marred by a vicious hit by the Capitals' Dale Hunter on the Islanders' leading scorer, Pierre Turgeon, moments after Turgeon had scored a third-period goal to put the game and the series out of reach for Washington. Turgeon suffered a separated shoulder on the play and missed almost all of the next round. For his actions, Hunter was suspended for the first 21 games of the 1993–94 season. This was the Islanders first playoff series victory since their 1987 triumph over Washington.

Clarence Campbell Conference

(N1) Chicago Blackhawks vs. (N4) St. Louis Blues

This was the ninth playoff series meeting between these two teams, with Chicago previously winning seven of the prior eight playoff meetings. This was a rematch of the previous year's Norris Division Semifinals, which Chicago won in six games.

The Blackhawks became the second division champion after the Bruins to be swept in the first round of the playoffs. On the series-winning overtime goal in game four, Chicago goaltender Ed Belfour complained that St. Louis star Brett Hull had interfered with him on the play, but to no avail, as the goal stood as the game and series winner. Belfour famously went on a rampage after the game, smashing his stick against the net, and breaking a hot tub, coffee maker and a television in the visitors' locker room at the St. Louis Arena. Belfour and Hull later became teammates on the Dallas Stars Stanley Cup winning team in 1999.

(N2) Detroit Red Wings vs. (N3) Toronto Maple Leafs
This was the 23rd playoff series meeting between these two teams. Both teams split the prior 22 playoff meetings. Detroit won the most recent meeting in six games in the 1988 Norris Division Semifinals.

In a revival of the heated Original Six rivalry, Nikolai Borschevsky's game seven overtime goal gave Toronto the series and made them the sixth club to eliminate a team with a better regular season record in the first round of the playoffs. This was also Toronto's first playoff series win over Detroit since the Maple Leafs beat the Red Wings in the 1964 Stanley Cup Finals. Until 2009, this was the last Clarence Campbell/Western Conference playoff series to be played entirely within the Eastern Time Zone.

(S1) Vancouver Canucks vs. (S4) Winnipeg Jets

This was the second overall playoff series between these two teams and was a rematch of last year's Smythe Division Semifinals, which Vancouver won in seven games.

Vancouver managed to defeat the Jets in six games and eliminate them in the first round for a second consecutive year. Game six was not without controversy as Greg Adams scored the first goal for the Canucks, however video replay showed the goal was clearly scored with a high-stick, the goal was allowed to stand. Adams went on to score the game winner in overtime and once again the goal was surrounded with controversy as video replay showed Adams crashing into the net and goalie Bob Essensa. This sent the puck into the net with the back of Essensa's skate. The goal also counted and Jet fans in attendance began to throw debris onto the ice in frustration with the call.

(S2) Calgary Flames vs. (S3) Los Angeles Kings

This was the sixth playoff series between these two teams. Los Angeles won three of the previous five meetings, including their most recent meeting in six games in the 1990 Smythe Division Semifinals.

The Kings upset the Flames in a high scoring six-game series. The winning team scored nine goals in three of the six games. Trailing two games to one and having lost two straight, Kings head coach Barry Melrose inserted backup goaltender Robb Stauber for the struggling Kelly Hrudey, who had allowed 17 goals against in 3 games. Stauber played brilliantly in the Kings 3–1 win in Game 4 as the series was tied at two wins apiece. The Kings offense was largely responsible for winning the series scoring nine goals in both Game 5 and 6.

Division Finals

Prince of Wales Conference

(A3) Montreal Canadiens vs. (A4) Buffalo Sabres

This was the sixth playoff series between these two teams. Montreal won three of the first five playoff meetings, including their most recent meeting in the 1991 Adams Division Semifinals in six games.

Montreal swept the series winning every game by a score of 4–3. A pivotal moment came in the second period of Game 3 when Sabres star Alexander Mogilny suffered a badly broken leg, ending what had been a tremendous campaign of 76 goals in 77 regular season games followed by seven goals in seven playoff games. As in their previous series, Montreal played three overtime games, this time winning all three of them.

This was the last time where a team who swept a playoff series in the first round was swept in the second round until the New York Islanders suffered the same fate in 2019.

(P1) Pittsburgh Penguins vs. (P3) New York Islanders

This was the third playoff series between these two teams. New York won both previous playoff meetings, including their most recent in the 1982 Patrick Division Semifinals 3–2.

The Islanders upset the two-time defending Stanley Cup champions. David Volek's overtime goal in game seven was the deciding goal as New York rallied from a 3–2 deficit to defeat the Penguins. Islanders defenceman Darius Kasparaitis played a large role in his team's win neutralizing Pittsburgh stars Mario Lemieux and Jaromir Jagr with big hits. With their upset of Pittsburgh, the Islanders reached the Wales Conference Finals for the first time since 1984. The Islanders did not win a playoff series again until 2016.

Clarence Campbell Conference

(N3) Toronto Maple Leafs vs. (N4) St. Louis Blues

This was the fourth playoff series meeting between these two teams. St. Louis won two of the previous three meetings. Their most recent meeting occurred in the 1990 Norris Division Semifinals, which St. Louis won in five games.

Toronto defeated St. Louis in seven games to advance to a league semifinal series for the first time since 1978, despite Blues' goaltender Curtis Joseph's best efforts. St. Louis was heavily outshot throughout the series including more than 60 shots in game one alone. Game 7 of the series was the first Game 7 to be played at Maple Leaf Gardens since game seven of the 1964 Stanley Cup Finals.

(S1) Vancouver Canucks vs. (S3) Los Angeles Kings
This was the third playoff series between these two teams. Both teams split their first two playoff meetings. Their most recent meeting occurred in the 1991 Smythe Division Semifinals, which Los Angeles won in six games.

This was the first Smythe Division Final since 1982 not to have either the Calgary Flames or the Edmonton Oilers. The Vancouver Canucks, who easily won the regular season Smythe Division title, were strong favourites over the Kings. Vancouver's 5–2 win in Game 1 did nothing to change that. Kings head coach Barry Melrose re-inserted Kelly Hrudey as the Kings' starting goaltender in Game 2 and he responded with a strong effort as the Kings evened the series with a 6–3 win. After the teams split the two games in Los Angeles, they headed back to Vancouver for the crucial Game 5. Kings forward Gary Shuchuk scored on a rebound during a goal mouth scramble late in the second overtime and the Kings skated off the ice in front of a stunned Vancouver home crowd with a 3–2 series lead. Back in Los Angeles for Game 6, the Canucks did not recover as the Kings jumped out to a 5–2 lead and won the series despite a late Canuck goal.

This was the only time during this era (1982–1993) that a Canadian team did not advance to the Conference Final representing the Smythe Division.

Conference Finals

All four conference finalists finished third in their respective divisions during the season.

Prince of Wales Conference Final

(A3) Montreal Canadiens vs. (P3) New York Islanders
This was the fourth playoff series between these two teams. Montreal won two of the previous three meetings. New York won the most recent meeting in the 1984 Wales Conference Finals in six games.

Montreal's win in Game 3 was their 11th straight, tying the single-playoff record set a year earlier by Pittsburgh and Chicago. Montreal added two more overtime victories during the series bringing their total to seven straight for the playoffs.

Clarence Campbell Conference Final

(N3) Toronto Maple Leafs vs. (S3) Los Angeles Kings
This was the third playoff series meeting between these two teams. Toronto won both previous meetings, including their most recent meeting in a two-game sweep in the 1978 Preliminary Round. This was the first conference final for both teams since the playoffs went to a conference format starting in 1982. Toronto last played a semifinal series in 1978; they were swept by Montreal. Los Angeles last played in such a series in 1969; they were swept by St. Louis. For the first time since 1982, this series did not have either the Calgary Flames or the Edmonton Oilers representing the Smythe Division, and it was the only one between then and 1994 not to feature a team from Western Canada.

During game one, Los Angeles defenceman Marty McSorley delivered a serious, open-ice hit on Toronto's Doug Gilmour. Leafs captain Wendel Clark took exception to the hit and went after McSorley for striking their star player. Toronto head coach Pat Burns tried scaling the bench to confront Los Angeles head coach Barry Melrose. After the game, McSorley claimed in the interviews he received dozens of threats on his hotel phone from angry fans. For their part, the Kings believed Gilmour had attempted to head-butt McSorley in retaliation, which would have made Gilmour subject to a game misconduct and a five-minute major penalty, had the butt been called. However, referee Don Koharski declined to do so.

The bad blood between the Kings and Gilmour traced back to the game of November 22, 1992, when Gilmour broke the left arm of Kings forward Tomas Sandström with a slash, drawing an eight-day suspension and sidelining Sandstrom for over a month. The fires of the feud were fanned by Hockey Night in Canada studio analyst Don Cherry, who heaped abuse on Melrose throughout the telecast, criticizing everything from his playing style to his haircut, and claimed Sandstrom had "deserved" to have his arm broken, for being a "ChickenSwede". Later, in a post-game interview, Cherry kissed Gilmour, further angering the Kings.

Toronto took a 3–2 series lead heading into game six in Los Angeles. With the game tied at four in overtime, Wayne Gretzky high-sticked Gilmour in the face, cutting his chin open. As with the alleged head-butt in Game 1, high sticking penalties that resulted in a cut at that time resulted in a five-minute major penalty and a game misconduct on the play. However, Gretzky was not penalized by referee Kerry Fraser and went on to score the winning goal moments later evening the series at three games each.

In game seven, Gretzky scored a hat-trick and added an assist to give the Kings another 5–4 win and the first Stanley Cup Finals berth in team history. Gretzky later called Game 7 of the 1993 Campbell Conference Finals the greatest game he had ever played. As of the end of the 2022 playoffs, this remains the closest the Maple Leafs have come to winning a Stanley Cup (five wins away) since their last title in 1967.

Stanley Cup Finals

This was the first and to date only playoff series between these two teams. The Canadiens had not won a Stanley Cup since 1986. This was the thirty-fourth Finals appearance for Montreal, while Los Angeles made their first ever appearance in the Finals. This was Wayne Gretzky's only appearance in the Finals with the Kings, and the last of his career. Patrick Roy won the Conn Smythe Trophy for the playoffs' MVP. This was the last Finals appearance for Montreal until 2021.

Playoff statistics

Skaters
These are the top ten skaters based on points.

Goaltenders
This is a combined table of the top five goaltenders based on goals against average and the top five goaltenders based on save percentage, with at least 420 minutes played. The table is sorted by GAA, and the criteria for inclusion are bolded.

References

See also
List of Stanley Cup champions

playoffs
Stanley Cup playoffs